Puerto Rico Highway 134 (PR-134) is a rural road that travels from Lares, Puerto Rico to Hatillo. This highway begins at its intersection with PR-111 in barrio Lares and ends at its junction with PR-129 in Campo Alegre.

Major intersections

See also

 List of highways numbered 134

References

External links
 

134